East Cass is an unorganized territory in Cass County, Minnesota, United States. The population was 43 at the 2000 census. It is part of the Brainerd Micropolitan Statistical Area.

Geography
According to the United States Census Bureau, the unorganized territory has a total area of 36.1 square miles (93.4 km2), of which 33.1 square miles (85.7 km2) is land and 3.0 square miles (7.7 km2) (8.26%) is water.

Demographics
At the 2000 census there were 43 people, 21 households, and 16 families living in the unorganized territory. The population density was 1.3 people per square mile (0.5/km2). There were 49 housing units at an average density of 1.5/sq mi (0.6/km2).  The racial makeup of the unorganized territory was 97.67% White, and 2.33% from two or more races.
Of the 21 households 23.8% had children under the age of 18 living with them, 61.9% were married couples living together, and 23.8% were non-families. 23.8% of households were one person and 9.5% were one person aged 65 or older. The average household size was 2.05 and the average family size was 2.38.

The age distribution was 14.0% under the age of 18, 7.0% from 18 to 24, 27.9% from 25 to 44, 27.9% from 45 to 64, and 23.3% 65 or older. The median age was 46 years. For every 100 females, there were 126.3 males. For every 100 females age 18 and over, there were 105.6 males.

The median household income was $36,250 and the median family income  was $37,500. Males had a median income of $26,250 versus $30,000 for females. The per capita income for the unorganized territory was $18,175. None of the population or the families were below the poverty line.

References

Populated places in Cass County, Minnesota
Unorganized territories in Minnesota
Brainerd, Minnesota micropolitan area